Hathor 29 - Coptic Calendar - Koiak 1

The thirtieth day of the Coptic month of Hathor, the third month of the Coptic year. On a common year, this day corresponds to November 26, of the Julian Calendar, and December 9, of the Gregorian Calendar. This day falls in the Coptic season of Peret, the season of emergence. This day falls in the Nativity Fast.

Commemorations

Saints 

 The martyrdom of Saint Macarius 
 The martyrdom of Saint John of Qalyub, the Monk 
 The departure of Saint Acacius, the Patriarch of Constantinople

Other commemorations 

 The consecration of the Church of Saints Cosmas, Damian, their Brothers, and their Mother, in Constantinople

References 

Days of the Coptic calendar